Singles Awareness Day (or Singles Appreciation Day) is celebrated on February 15 each year. It is an unofficial holiday celebrated by single people. It serves as a complement to Valentine's Day for people who are single, and not married or in a romantic relationship. It is a celebration of love in all forms recognizing the love between friends, family and loving yourself. Some people who observe Singles Awareness Day do so out of spite for Valentine's Day, as a Hallmark holiday, or for other reasons.

Singles Awareness Day is also referred to as an antithesis of Valentine's Day, especially when celebrated on February 14. Singles Awareness Day is also known as SAD particularly when it is negatively observed about the inability to find love.

The United Kingdom has two 'days' attributed to highlighting single status. Since Single Awareness Day spells SAD and a group of dating experts wanted to highlight a more positive tone, creating National Singles Day. It is celebrated on 11 March with the aim to empower those who identify themselves as single.

On Singles Awareness Day, single people gather to celebrate or to commiserate in their single status. Some want to remind romantic couples that they don't need to be in a relationship to celebrate life.

History of Singles Awareness Day

Valentine’s Day is celebrated every year on the 14th of February, and the next day on the 15th of February, Singles Awareness Day is celebrated. But there is no exact information about when Single Awareness Day started.

It is said that Single Awareness Day is born because of Social Isolation. In 2001, a high school student named Dustin Barns decided to form a group with his friends so that instead of wallowing in the sorrows of being singles, they could use a day to celebrate singleness.

For this, thought of doing something like this so that people get to know about this day. These people chose February 15 as a protest against Valentine’s Day and started selling candies and chocolates at a huge discount. The aim was to inform as many people as possible about this day.

Dustin passes this tradition from high school to Mississippi State University where it got very popular. Because of this, 15 February was copyrighted in 2015 as a single awareness day, and since then this day became popular all over the world.

College students along with their single friends started organizing parties and started celebrating this day by giving gifts to each other. Since then people of all ages started symbolizing this day that there is no need for any relationship to enjoy love. 

You can love yourself and your family, and friends and celebrate with them. It is also said that Dustin also met his soulmate at the Single Awareness Day party, who later became his wife.

See also
Black Day (South Korea)
Singles' Day
Singles event
Mardi Gras
Carnival
Friendship Day

References

Further reading

Unofficial observances
February observances